Jean Louis Schefer (7 December 1938 – 7 June 2022) was a French writer, philosopher, art critic, and theoretician of cinema and image.

Career 
Born in Paris, France, a graduate of the École des Hautes Études en Sciences Sociales on Les écritures figuratives, a problème de grammaire égyptienne (under the guidance of Roland Barthes and Algirdas Julien Greimas), Schefer worked in Milan from 1965 to 1966, in the preparation of a dictionary, then in Venice from 1967 to 1968. In Italy he presented works of Gianfranco Pardi, Titina Maselli, Gianni Colombo and others. From 1970 to 1981 he taught in Paris.

He collaborated with the magazines Tel Quel, Communications, Information sur les sciences sociales, Littérature, Critique, and Cahiers du Cinéma.

Bibliography 

1969: Scénographie d’un tableau, Éditions du Seuil, Tel Quel
1975: L’Invention du corps chrétien, Éditions Galilée
1980: L’Homme ordinaire du cinéma, Cahiers du cinéma/Éditions Gallimard
1985: Origine du crime, Café-Climat
1987: Gilles Aillaud, 
1992: De la peinture - De Pictura (1435) by Leon Battista Alberti, preface, translation from Latin and notes by Jean-Louis Schefer, Macula Dédale
1995: La Lumière et la Table, Maeght éditeur
1995: Question de style, L’Harmattan
1995: The Enigmatic Body, Cambridge University Press
1997: Du monde et du mouvement des images, Cahiers du cinéma
1998: Main courante, 
1998: Figures peintes, P.O.L, (Prix France Culture, 1999)
1998: Cinématographies, P.O.L
1998: Choses écrites, P.O.L
1998: Goya, la dernière hypothèse, Maeght éditeur
1999: Main courante 2, P.O.L
1999: Lumière du Corrège, P.O.L
1999: Questions d'art paléolithique, P.O.L
1999: Paolo Ucello, le Déluge, P.O.L
1999: Sommeil du Greco, P.O.L
1999: Images mobiles, P.O.L
2001: Main courante 3, P.O.L
2002: Polyxène et la vierge à la robe rouge, P.O.L
2002: Chardin, P.O.L
2004: Une maison de peinture, ed. Enigmatic
2005: Figures de différents caractères, P.O.L
2007:  L’Hostie profanée - histoire d’une fiction théologique, P.O.L, 
2009: La Cause des portraits, P.O.L
2010: De quel tremblement de terre..., P.O.L
2011: Le Temps dont je suis l'hypothèse, P.O.L
2013: Monsieur Teste à l'école, P.O.L
2016: Squelettes et autres fantaisies, P.O.L

References

External links 
 Jean-Louis Schefer on Libération (5 October 1995)
 Jean-Louis Schefer La Transsubstantiation 1/2 on YouTube
 Jean-Louis Schefer on the site of Éditions P.O.L
 The Enigmatic Body: Essays on the Arts
 An Enigmatic Text: Schefer's Quest upon a Thing Unknown
 Jean Louis Schefer Une vie en peinture by Anne Bertrand on VACARME (February 2014)
 Jean-Louis Schefer on France Culture
 Rencontre avec Jean-Louis Schefer on M.E.L (7 December 2016)
 

1938 births
2022 deaths
20th-century French essayists
21st-century French essayists
French art critics
Prix France Culture winners
Writers from Paris